The women's snowboard cross competition of the FIS Snowboarding World Championships 2011 was held at Alabaus in La Molina, Spain between January 17 and 18, 2011. 28 athletes from 17 countries competed.

The qualification round was completed on January 17, while the elimination round was completed on January 18.

Results

Qualification

Elimination round

Quarterfinals
The top 16 qualifiers advanced to the quarterfinals round. From here, they participated in four-person elimination races, with the top two from each race advancing. 

Quarterfinal 1

Quarterfinal  3

Quarterfinal 2

Quarterfinal 4

Semifinals

Semifinal 1

Semifinal 2

Finals
Small final

Large final

References

Snowboard cross, women's